The following is a list of UK government data losses. It lists reported instances of the loss of personal data by UK central and local government, agencies, non-departmental public bodies, etc., whether directly or indirectly because of the actions of private-sector contractors. Such losses tend to receive widespread media coverage in the UK.

United Kingdom politics-related lists